The Archives of the City of Brussels preserves documents related to the City of Brussels (Belgium) and its history. It holds the third largest collection of newspapers and periodicals in Belgium. The public can access its collections through its online catalog, visiting the archive itself, or visiting a museum exhibiting loaned items.

History
Archives were first kept in Brussels in the Church of Saint Micheal and the Church of Saint Nicholas' tower. In the 16th century, these collections were joined together in the Town Hall. In the 17th century, the collection was moved to two buildings on the Grand-Place/Grote Markt (Brussels' main square). These buildings and some of the city's records were destroyed during the Nine Years' War.

In 1979, the Archives moved into a complex of buildings that formerly housed a textile business. The building is noted as an example of 20th-century commercial architecture.

References

External links
 Official website

Archives in Belgium
Museums in Brussels
City archives
History of Brussels
Government of Brussels